The Nepean Knights is a minor lacrosse association playing within the Ontario Lacrosse Association. The name is also shared by The Nepean Knights Jr. B and a newly formed (2019) Junior C team. While the Jr. B team is privately owned, the Junior C team is owned by the minor association.

  Nepean Nights Minor Lacrosse Assosication box lacrosse team from Nepean, Ontario, Canada.  The Knights play in the Ontario Lacrosse Association.
  Junior "B" box lacrosse team from Nepean, Ontario, Canada.  The Knights play in the OLA Junior B Lacrosse League.
  Junior "C" box lacrosse team from Nepean, Ontario, Canada.  The Nepean Knights play in the OLA Junior C Lacrosse League.

Junior B history
The Nepean Knights history actually dates back well before its 1993 inception.  The original Nepean junior team was the Nepean Lumberjacks of the OLA Junior "C" league in 1975 and 1976.  Nepean was virtually a vacant lot for lacrosse until the 1990s, when locals applied for an expansion team in the OLA.  In 1993, the Knights and the Mimico Mountaineers were granted expansion into the OLA Junior "B" league.  Unlike Mimico, which has seemed to carry rather average results every year, Nepean seems to have more of one extreme or the other.  From 1993 until 1997, the Knights only pulled off 19 victories in 110 contests.  They failed to make the playoffs each year and were looking much like a failed franchise.  But from 1998 to 2004 with the exception of a rather average 2002 seasons, the Knights hit the OLA like a Bat out of Hell.  They made the playoffs seven straight year and made it to the semi-finals four times.  They even finished first place in their conference in 1998, and made to the semis in their first ever playoff.

The 2005 to 2007 seasons were not so plentiful.  Junior A lacrosse came to Ottawa in 2005 and that team drew most of its players from the Knights roster.  This resulted in the team having three straight losing seasons, despite coming close to cracking .500 in 2006.  With the Ottawa Titans on a two-year leave of absence, the Knights 2008 season was big improvement with the team going 11-9 and having a strong showing in the playoffs against the Mimico Mountaineers.

Jr. B season-by-season results
Note: GP = Games played, W = Wins, L = Losses, T = Ties, Pts = Points, GF = Goals for, GA = Goals against

Junior C history
In 2019, The Nepean Knights were granted a team to be a part of membership of the OLA Junior "C" league.

External links
Nepean Knights Minor Lacrosse Webpage
Knights Webpage
The Bible of Lacrosse
Unofficial OLA Page

Ontario Lacrosse Association teams